Integrated Blood Pressure Control is a peer-reviewed medical journal covering research on hypertension using integrated treatments and strategies. The journal was established in 2008 and is published by Dove Medical Press. The editor-in-chief is Steven Atlas (Mount Sinai School of Medicine).

Abstracting and indexing 
The journal is abstracted and indexed in PubMed, Chemical Abstracts Service, EMBASE, and Scopus.

External links 
 

English-language journals
Open access journals
Dove Medical Press academic journals
Publications established in 2008
Cardiology journals